WFCU may refer to:

WFCU Centre, a sports-entertainment centre in Windsor, Ontario
Windsor Family Credit Union, a credit union in Windsor, Ontario
Wings Financial Credit Union, a credit union based in Minnesota